Härlanda Park is the new name for Härlanda Fängelse (Härlanda Prison), and the area surrounding it.

Härlanda Fängelse is a defunct prison in Härlanda borough, Gothenburg, Sweden. It is now home to, among other things, the local administration.

History
It was designed by the architect Gustaf Lindgren and ready for use in 1907. In 1997 it was declared a listed historical building, and as such protected from demolishing. The last prisoner moved out of the prison in 1997.

External links
 http://www.liljewall-arkitekter.se/aktuella/objekt/harlanda.html

Defunct prisons in Sweden
Buildings and structures in Gothenburg
1907 establishments in Sweden
1997 disestablishments in Sweden